Centennial Park is an unincorporated community and census-designated place (CDP) in Mohave County, Arizona, United States. The population was 1,578 at the 2020 census, up from 1,264 at the 2010 census. It is the central location for the Centennial Park group, a fundamentalist Mormon group.

Geography
Centennial Park is located in northeastern Mohave County at  (36.953806, -112.981325). It is bordered to the north by the town of Colorado City. Arizona State Route 389 passes through the CDP, leading east  to Fredonia and northwest into Utah, where it becomes Utah Route 59, leading  to Hurricane.

Demographics

As of the 2010 census, there were 1,264 people living in the CDP: 569 male and 695 female. 781 were 19 years old or younger, 242 were ages 20–34, 153 were between the ages of 35 and 49, 67 were between 50 and 64, and the remaining 21 were aged 65 and above. The median age was 15.0 years.

The racial makeup of the CDP was 94.6% White, 0.2% Black or African American, 0.2% Asian, 0.1% Native Hawaiian,  2.0% Other,  and 2.9% two or more races.  5.1% of the population were Hispanic or Latino of any race.

There were 207 households in the CDP, 187 family households (90.3%) and 20 non-family households (9.7%), with an average household size of 6.11. Of the family households, 127 were married couples living together, with 20 single father and 40 single mother households, while the non-family households included 17 adults living alone: 5 male and 12 female.

The CDP contained 225 housing units, of which 207 were occupied and 18 were vacant.

Education
It is zoned to Colorado City Unified School District.

References

Census-designated places in Mohave County, Arizona
Mormon fundamentalism
Populated places established in 1984
Towns in Mohave County, Arizona